Eucalyptus ligustrina, commonly known as the privet-leaved stringybark, is a species of shrub, mallee or small tree that is endemic to New South Wales. It has rough, stringy bark, lance-shaped to egg-shaped adult leaves, flower buds in groups of between seven and fifteen, white flowers and hemispherical or shortened spherical fruit.

Description
Flowering has been recorded from April to May and from September to October and the flowers are white.

Taxonomy and naming
Eucalyptus ligustrina was first formally described in 1828 by the Swiss botanist Augustin Pyramus de Candolle in Prodromus Systematis Naturalis Regni Vegetabilis. The specific epithet (ligustrina) is a reference to the similarity of the leaves to those of plants in the genus Ligustrum.

Disgribution and habitat
Privet-leaved stringybark occurs in New South Wales from the Gibraltar Range National Park in the north to Deua National Park in the south. The principal area however, is in the Blue Mountains. The habitat is dry sclerophyll woodland or heathland, on poor soils derived from sandstone or acidic granite.

References

ligustrina
Myrtales of Australia
Flora of New South Wales
Mallees (habit)
Trees of Australia
Plants described in 1828
Taxa named by Augustin Pyramus de Candolle